Eric Lowther (born August 31, 1954) is a Canadian politician, who represented the electoral district of Calgary Centre in the House of Commons of Canada from 1997 to 2000. Lowther was born in Regina, Saskatchewan.

Lowther, a business manager before entering politics, was first elected in the 1997 election as a Reform Party MP. With the Reform Party merged into the Canadian Alliance in 2000, he stood as the Alliance candidate in the 2000 election, but was defeated by Progressive Conservative leader Joe Clark.

Lowther ran for the Conservative Party of Canada nomination in the electoral district of Wild Rose, but lost to Blake Richards.

External links
 

1954 births
Canadian Alliance MPs
20th-century Canadian politicians
Living people
Members of the House of Commons of Canada from Alberta
Politicians from Regina, Saskatchewan
Reform Party of Canada MPs